Tony Oliver is an American voice actor best known for voicing Rick Hunter from Robotech, Lancer from Fate/stay night, and Arsène Lupin III from Lupin the Third. He helped produce the live action shows Mighty Morphin Power Rangers and VR Troopers.

Filmography

Anime

Animation

Live-action roles

Film

Video game roles

Documentaries

References

External links

 Official website
 
 
 

Living people
American male screenwriters
American male television writers
American male video game actors
American male voice actors
American television directors
American television producers
American television writers
American voice directors
Robotech cast and crew
Year of birth missing (living people)